Eqlid (also Romanized as Eqlīd, Eklīd, and Iqlīd) is a city and capital of Eqlid County, Fars Province, Iran.  At the 2006 census, its population was 49,709, in 1,497 families.

Eqlid is located 22 km west of the Expressway between Isfahan and Shiraz.  The population of Eghlid is about 45,000 (2011). It is located close to the mountain chain Zagros and is one of the highest elevations (a mountain peak known as Bel) among Iran cities (2250 meters). It is also close to the desert city of Abarqu, making it a city in the border of high mountain and desert. It has a dry and cold weather, and some of its mountain peaks are covered by snow throughout the year. It is an agriculture city and its main products are wheat, barley, potato and fruits like grapes, walnut, apple, and pear. Its main  road is Emam Khomeini Boulevard.

Historical background

During the Achamenid empire its name was azargarta.(source: Parto-e vahid dar asrare takhte jamshid )

Eghlid's name might come from "kelid," which means key in Persian. Up to the recent years, older people used to call it "kelil." The main reason behind this name is that it was the main gateway to Fars, and specially Persepolis in the old ages and the road called "royal road" used to pass through it. other routes to Persepolis were mountainous and difficult to pass.

Legend says that Eghlid was built by three brothers called Elias, Aslam, and Orjam. There are three main neighborhood (which used to be three castles) in Eghlid bearing the name of these three brothers: Eliasan, Aslaman, Orjaman.

Eghlid has many historical places dating back to pre-Islamic era.

There is an old mosque in the center of the city (jame' mosque)

Universities and higher education centers 
The following universities and centers are located in Euclid:

 Islamic Azad University 
 Payam Noor Uni of Eghlid
 Eghlid University
 Eghlid Higher Education Center

See also

Aba Saleh al-Mahdi tunnel
Seyyed Mohammad Bagher Movahed Abtahi

References

External links
 

Populated places in Eqlid County
Cities in Fars Province